Robin Renucci (born 11 July 1956, in Le Creusot, Saône-et-Loire) is a French film and television actor and film director.

Acting filmography

 Eaux profondes (1981) : Ralph
 Les Misérables (1982) : Courfeyrac
 Invitation au voyage (1982) : Gérard
 Escalier C (1984)
 La baston (1985) : René Levasseur
 Masks (1987) : Roland Wolf
 The King's Whore (1990) : Charles de Luynes
 Credit Bonheur (1996) : Paul Choquet
 Children of the Century (1999) : François Buloz
 The Dreamers (2003)  : Father 
 Arsène Lupin (2004)  : Duke of Dreux-Soubise 
 Comedy of Power (2006) : Philippe Charmant-Killman
 Dolce Fine Giornata (2019)
 Leonardo (2021)  : Piero da Vinci

Television-acting work

Directing filmography

References

External links

 

1956 births
Living people
20th-century French male actors
20th-century French people
21st-century French male actors
21st-century French people
French male film actors
French film directors
French male television actors
People from Le Creusot
French National Academy of Dramatic Arts alumni